is an Ōbaku Zen temple in Yanagawa, Fukuoka, Japan.

History
The temple was originally located in Shingū and called Tachibanazan Baigaku-ji (立花山梅岳寺), a Sōtō temple. In 1587, however, Tachibana Muneshige who was granted the three districts of Chikugo Province, Yamato, Shimotsuma and Mizuma and built a castle in Yanagawa, started to move to the present location.

It was originally a Sōtō temple, but in 1669, Tachibana Tadashige, the third lord of Yanagawa Domain, has been converted to the Ōbaku school temple. Tadashige invited Tetsumon Dōchi, the elder son of Mu'an and changed the name to Fukugon-ji. It later became the Tachibana clan's funeral temple and all nine of the Tachibana families are buried here.

There is a cemetery in the back of the main hall, and the graves of some famous novelists such as Ken Hase, Kazuo Dan etc.

References

External links

Fukugon-ji - Yanagawa City 

Buddhist temples in Fukuoka Prefecture
Buildings and structures in Fukuoka Prefecture
Religious buildings and structures completed in 1587
1580s establishments in Japan
1587 establishments in Asia
Obaku temples